Holcombe may refer to:

Places
United Kingdom
 Holcombe, Greater Manchester
 Holcombe, East Devon
 Holcombe, Somerset
 Holcombe, Teignbridge, Devon
 Holcombe Manor, Chatham, Kent
 Holcombe Rogus, Devon
 Holcombe Court, Devon
 Holcombe Burnell, a Devon parish
United States
 Holcombe, Wisconsin, unincorporated community
 Lake Holcombe, Wisconsin, town
 Holcombe Flowage, recreation area, Wisconsin

Other uses
 Holcombe (surname)
 Holcombe Hockey Club, Rochester, Kent
 Holcombe Legion, a unit in the Confederate States Army during the American Civil War

See also
Holcomb (disambiguation)